R.B. Korbet (born Rebecca Bronwyn Korbet) is an American musician. She contributed drumming and vocals to King Missile (Dog Fly Religion), the first incarnation of art rock band King Missile. She has also played guitar in the bands Even Worse (in which she was also the singer), Chop Shop, Hit by a Truck, Missing Foundation, Pussy Galore, Madgodz, Bubba Zanetti (NYC), Sloth, Hellvis (NYC), the Floyds of Flatbush, the Wharton Tiers Ensemble and Judas Livingston Seagull, and bass in the bands Big Stick, Navigator and Verona Downs.

Since 2019 she has played bass and sang (back-ups, some lead) with Carvels NYC. Korbet also sat in with Brooklyn-based Um several times. In the duo Silk Cut with King Missile's John S. Hall she plays all instruments (except ukulele) and produces. In 2020 Korbet contributed the track 'The Power Broker' to Marc Sloan's Reel To Real vol. 1 compilation, and joined NYC legends Bush Tetras on bass. 

In 2021, Korbet formed Highly Effective People, the trio in which she plays bass also sings. with Vern Woodhead on guitar and vocals (Woodhead) and Alex Baker on drums (Skull Practitioners).

Selected discography

References
 R. B. Korbet on Discogs
'None The Worse for Wear: The Life & Times of R.B. Korbet', December 2015
R.B. Korbet on 'Know Your Bass Player', April 2020
The New York Hardcore Chronicles 10 Questions w/ RB Korbet (Even Worse)
Review of Bush Tetras 1/23/21, 'Bush Tetras: Live Stream from (Le) Poisson Rouge'

Living people
American rock drummers
King Missile members
American rock guitarists
Year of birth missing (living people)